Ludovicus Schoenmaekers (born 15 September 1931) is a Belgian former swimmer. He competed in the men's 200 metre breaststroke at the 1952 Summer Olympics.

References

External links
 

1931 births
Living people
Belgian male breaststroke swimmers
Olympic swimmers of Belgium
Swimmers at the 1952 Summer Olympics
Sportspeople from Turnhout